Tamanduateí is a station on Line 2 (Green) of the São Paulo Metro and Line 10 (Turquoise) of the CPTM commuter train.

Station layout

SPTrans lines
The following SPTrans bus lines can be accessed. Passengers may use a Bilhete Único card for transfer:

EMTU lines
The following EMTU bus lines can be accessed:

References

São Paulo Metro stations
Companhia Paulista de Trens Metropolitanos stations
Railway stations opened in 2010